The Canadian Journal of Theology was a quarterly academic journal of theology published by the University of Toronto Press that appeared from 1955 to 1970. Notable contributors were Karl Barth, Rudolf Bultmann, Paul Tillich, Norman Pittenger, R. B. Y. Scott, Hilda Neatby, Alan Richardson, George C. Pidgeon, John McIntyre, Thomas F. Torrance, Tom Harpur, Godfrey Ridout, George B. Caird, Donald D. Evans, Philip Carrington, Gregory Baum, Robert Dobbie, Eric Lionel Mascall, and Stephen Neill.

See also 
 Toronto Journal of Theology

References 

Christianity studies journals
Publications established in 1955
English-language journals
Quarterly journals
University of Toronto
Publications disestablished in 1970
Defunct journals
University of Toronto Press academic journals
1955 establishments in Canada